Clackmannanshire and Dunblane (Gaelic: Siorrachd Chlach Mhanann agus Dùn Bhlàthain) constituency of the Scottish Parliament (Holyrood) covering part of the Stirling council area and the entirety of Clackmannanshire. It elects one Member of the Scottish Parliament (MSP) by the plurality (first past the post) method of election. It is also one of nine constituencies in the Mid Scotland and Fife electoral region, which elects seven additional members, in addition to the nine constituency MSPs, to produce a form of proportional representation for the region as a whole. Created in 2011, the constituency covers much of the area previously in the abolished Ochil.

The seat has been held by Keith Brown of the Scottish National Party since its creation; Brown was previously the MSP for the preceding constituency of Ochil.

Electoral region 

The other eight constituencies of the Mid Scotland and Fife region are Cowdenbeath, Dunfermline, Kirkcaldy, Mid Fife and Glenrothes, North East Fife, Perthshire North, Perthshire South and Kinross-shire and Stirling.

The region covers all of the Clackmannanshire council area, all of the Fife council area, all of the Perth and Kinross council area and all of the Stirling council area.

Constituency boundaries and council areas 

The constituency was created for the 2011 Scottish Parliament election and largely replaced the former constituency of Ochil, also drawing some areas that were formerly in the Stirling constituency. It covers all of the Clackmannanshire council area, whilst the rest of the Stirling council area is covered by the Stirling constituency.

The electoral wards used in the creation of Clackmannanshire and Dunblane are:

Clackmannanshire Central
Clackmannanshire East
Clackmannanshire North
Clackmannanshire South
Clackmannanshire West
Dunblane and Bridge of Allan (Stirling)

Member of the Scottish Parliament

Election results

2020s

2010s

Footnotes

External links

2011 establishments in Scotland
Alloa
Clackmannan
Constituencies established in 2011
Constituencies of the Scottish Parliament
Dollar, Clackmannanshire
Dunblane
Politics of Clackmannanshire
Politics of Stirling (council area)
Scottish Parliament constituencies and regions from 2011